O'Garney Park is a GAA stadium in Sixmilebridge, County Clare, Ireland. It is the home of Sixmilebridge GAA club and is one of the main grounds of Clare GAA's Gaelic football and hurling teams.

It can hold about 7,000 spectators, including an 800-seater stand. It first saw inter-county use in the 1994–95 National Hurling League. Today, it sees inter-county hurling in the Munster Senior Hurling League.

References

Clare GAA
Gaelic games grounds in the Republic of Ireland
Sports venues in County Clare